Wildflowers is the second solo studio album by American musician Tom Petty, released on November 1, 1994. The album was the first released by Petty after signing a contract with Warner Bros. Records (where he had recorded as part of the Traveling Wilburys) and the first of three albums produced by Rick Rubin. The album was certified 3× platinum in the United States by the Recording Industry Association of America.

In 2020, the album was ranked at number 214 on Rolling Stones Greatest Albums of All Time list.

 Production 
Wildflowers was credited only to Petty and not to his usual band, Tom Petty and the Heartbreakers because, in Petty's words, "Rick [Rubin] and I both wanted more freedom than to be strapped into five guys." Nonetheless, the Heartbreakers predominantly served as the musicians on the album. The album features all the band's members with the exception of drummer Stan Lynch. Petty auditioned numerous drummers for the album, and eventually chose Steve Ferrone. Petty fired Lynch from the Heartbreakers just before the album's release, and Ferrone officially joined the touring band the following year, and later became a full band member. (Lynch did play on one outtake from Wildflowers, "Something Could Happen").

Petty wrote and recorded numerous songs for the album, and the original plan was to have Wildflowers be a double album, with 25 songs in total. However, Lenny Waronker of Warner Bros. Records felt that the album was too long, and it was decided to reduce the album to 15 tracks. Of the 10 tracks left out, one, "Leave Virginia Alone", notably became a hit single the following year when it was recorded by Rod Stewart, while another four were included, in modified form, in Tom Petty and the Heartbreakers' next album, the soundtrack album to the 1996 film She's the One. All ten songs, in their original form, were finally released in the 2020 re-released edition of Wildflowers, Wildflowers & All the Rest.

 Release 
Four singles were released from the album between 1994 and 1995, the most successful of which, "You Don't Know How It Feels", reached No. 13 on the Billboard Hot 100 and topped the Album Rock Tracks chart for one week. It was followed by "You Wreck Me", "It's Good to Be King" and "A Higher Place" which reached Nos. 2, 6, and 12 respectively on the Mainstream Rock chart. The title track, while not released as a single, charted at #16 on the Billboard Hot Rock Songs chart and at #3 on the Billboard Lyric Find. and became one of Petty's most streamed and popular songs.

Rolling Stone placed Wildflowers at number 12 on their list of the best albums of the 1990s. Guitar World placed the album at number 49 in their "Superunknown: 50 Iconic Albums That Defined 1994" list.

In April 2015, when Petty's back catalog was released in high-resolution audio, this was one of only two albums not included in the series (Songs and Music from "She's the One" was the other one), but a hi-res version was available on Pono Music.

The title of the 2020 book Somewhere You Feel Free: Tom Petty and Los Angeles comes from a lyric in the album's title song "Wildflowers".

 2020 re-release 
Petty's family and bandmates arranged a 2020 re-release of the album that includes deleted songs, demos, and live tracks, entitled Wildflowers & All the Rest. The super deluxe edition of the box set included a fifth disc of alternate versions of the Wildflowers tracks, called Finding Wildflowers. In April 2021, Finding Wildflowers was released individually.

 Documentary 
The making of Wildflowers is the subject of the 2021 documentary film Tom Petty: Somewhere You Feel Free - The Making of Wildflowers, directed by Mary Wharton. The documentary includes a significant amount of archival footage from the recording sessions, recorded by Martyn Atkins, which had only recently been unearthed following Petty's death; as well as new interviews with many of the producers and musicians who had been involved with the album. The film was released in November 2021 on YouTube.

Track listing

 All the Rest 

Outtakes
"Girl on LSD" was released as the B-side of the "You Don't Know How It Feels" single (1994).
"Leave Virginia Alone" was another song written and recorded during the sessions and left off the finished album. It was given to Rod Stewart for his album A Spanner in the Works (1995).
The songs "California", "Hope You Never", "Hung Up and Overdue", and "Climb That Hill" were all included on the She's the One soundtrack album (1996), with various edits across the first three tracks, while "Climb That Hill" was a complete remake.
 In 2018, outtake "Lonesome Dave," recorded July 23, 1993, was released on Petty's posthumous box set An American Treasure.
 In 2021, a cover of J.J. Cale's "Thirteen Days," recorded July 22, 1993, was released on the reimagined version of She's the One soundtrack album, Angel Dream.

Personnel
 Tom Petty – vocals (all tracks), acoustic guitar (1, 2, 6, 8, 9, 11, 12, 16-19, 20, 21, 23, 25), electric guitar (2-5, 7, 10, 13, 14, 20, 22, 24), harmonica (2, 12, 20, 21), bass guitar (2, 12, 20), harmony vocals (2, 5, 14, 20-22, 24), Hammond organ (14), piano (15), percussion (16), harpsichord (22)
 Mike Campbell – electric guitar (tracks 2, 4, 5, 7, 9–14, 16, 17, 19, 20, 22-25), bass guitar (1, 3, 5, 6, 12, 13–15, 20, 23, 24), slide guitar (3, 25), acoustic guitar (8), coral sitar (11), harpsichord (1), piano (20), Hammond organ (23), drums (23) 
 Benmont Tench – piano (tracks 1, 3–7, 9, 10, 12–14, 16, 17,  25), grand piano (2), electric piano (2, 24), Hammond organ (4, 6, 9, 12, 14, 22), Mellotron (6, 14, 25), tack piano (11), harmonium (1, 6, 12, 16, 17, 19), zenon (11), orchestron (12)
 Howie Epstein – harmony vocals (tracks 2, 4, 5, 13, 14,  16, 17, 19, 24), bass guitar (4, 7, 10, 16, 19, 22, 25), backing vocals (7)
 Steve Ferrone – drums (tracks 1-7, 9, 10, 12–15, 17, 19, 20, 22, 24)Additional musicians Lenny Castro – percussion (tracks 1, 2, 5, 7, 9, 11, 12, 14, 25)
 Brandon Fields – saxophone (track 13)
 Greg Herbig – saxophone (track 13)
 Jim Horn – saxophone (track 13)
 Kim Hutchcroft – saxophone (track 13)
 Phil Jones – percussion (tracks 4, 10, 20, 22)
 Michael Kamen – orchestration, conductor (tracks 1, 3, 5, 12, 15)
 Stan Lynch – drums (track 16)
 John Pierce – bass guitar (track 9)
 Marty Rifkin – pedal steel guitar (track 13)
 Ringo Starr – drums (tracks 11, 25)
 Carl Wilson – backing vocals (tracks 7, 25)Production'

 Joe Barresi – assistant engineer
 David Bianco – engineer
 Mike Campbell – producer
 Richard Dodd – engineer, mixer
 Steve Holyrod – assistant engineer
 Kenji Nasai – assistant mixer
 Tom Petty – producer
 Rick Rubin – producer
 Jim Scott – engineer
 Jeff Sheehan – assistant engineer

Charts

Certifications

References

External links

Tom Petty albums
1994 albums
Albums produced by Rick Rubin
Albums produced by Tom Petty
Warner Records albums
Albums recorded at Sound City Studios
Albums produced by Mike Campbell (musician)
Grammy Award for Best Engineered Album, Non-Classical